Dewsbury railway station served the town of Dewsbury, West Yorkshire, England from 1867 to 1961 on the Dewsbury Branch Railway.

History 
The station opened as Dewsbury on 1 April 1867 by the Lancashire and Yorkshire Railway. The station's name was changed to Dewsbury Market Place on 2 June 1924. It closed to passengers on 1 December 1930 and to goods traffic in 1961. The station is now demolished.

References 

Disused railway stations in Kirklees
Railway stations in Great Britain opened in 1866
Railway stations in Great Britain closed in 1930
1866 establishments in England
1961 disestablishments in England